The United Airlines pilot Master Executive Council (MEC) of the Air Line Pilots Association, International (ALPA) is the administrative body that represents United Airlines pilots.

 The UAL MEC represents over 13,000 pilots at United as their formal collective bargaining agent under the Railway Labor Act. They are responsible for negotiating pilot contracts, in addition to enhancing airline safety and security.

History
 
On July 27, 1931, under the leadership of United Captain Dave Behncke, the Air Line Pilots Association (ALPA) was created. Captain Dave Behncke served as ALPA's first president, from 1931 until 1951, during which time ALPA became active in Washington, D.C. and worked to secure legislation that made the airline piloting profession safer for both workers and passengers. Today, the United MEC continues its history of involvement on Capitol Hill, along with promoting legislation that benefits pilots, advances airline safety, and enhances security.

The ALPA motto is "Schedule with Safety" and many of the safety features found in current aircraft and airports are the result of United ALPA volunteer initiatives. Their contract, the United Pilot Agreement, establishes work rules and provides for higher pay, making them one of the highest paid pilot groups in the industry.

Leadership 
 
Every two years, the United MEC elects four officers to serve the pilots of United Airlines as MEC leadership. Captain Todd Insler, a 26-year veteran of United Airlines, was unanimously reelected in January, 2020 and is serving his third term as chairman. Captain Insler previously held positions as MEC Grievance Committee chairman and vice chairman. Additionally, Mr. Insler is a member of the Board of Directors at United Continental Holdings, Inc. Captain Tom Murphy, based in Washington D.C., serves as Vice Chairman. Denver Based Captain Bill Neveu serves as Secretary, and Washington D.C. based Captain Rick Cameron serves as Treasurer.

On the local level, the United MEC consists of member-elected representatives at the eleven United domiciles throughout the United States and Guam. Local pilot volunteers form the foundation of the committee, and full-time ALPA staff assist the group with legal, administrative, and communications support.

In 2018, two United pilots were elected as national officers of ALPA: Captain Bob Fox was elected ALPA's First Vice President and Captain Joseph Genovese was elected Vice President - Finance/Treasurer.

Notable Events 

 ALPA was founded by United Captain David L. Behncke and 23 other key figures in Chicago, Illinois, on July 27, 1931. In the 1930s, flying was a perilous occupation; thus, from the time of its formation, one of ALPA’s main goals was to improve air safety.
 On May 17, 1985, United Pilot commenced a 29 day strike as United Airlines Chairman Richard Ferris pushed for a two-tier pay scale for pilots.

References 

United Airlines
Trade unions in the United States
Airline pilots' trade unions
Trade unions established in 1931